Frédéric Auburtin (born 4 June 1962) is a French director, writer, actor and producer.

Life and career
Frédéric Auburtin was born and grew up in Marseille, where he studied music (piano, drums) and literature before turning to the cinema in the early 80s. He made his debut as an assistant director in the film Rouge midi, directed by Robert Guédiguian.

In the 80s and 90s he worked as an assistant director in several movies and with several directors, including Maurice Pialat (Under the Sun of Satan), Luigi Comencini (La Bohème), Richard Heffron (La Révolution française), Bertrand Blier (Merci la vie), Jean-Jacques Annaud (The Lover), Claude Berri (Germinal and Lucie Aubrac), Jean-Paul Rappeneau (The Horseman on the Roof) and Randall Wallace (The Man in the Iron Mask).

In 1999, he debuted as a director, co-directing Un pont entre deux rives with Gérard Depardieu, for which he also composed the soundtrack. During the 2000s he kept directing mostly for television, but also directed movies, including San-Antonio (2004) and Envoyés très spéciaux (2009). In 2006, he co-directed (again with Depardieu) the segment "Quartier Latin", written and starred by Gena Rowlands with Ben Gazzara and Gérard Depardieu, in the highly acclaimed movie Paris, je t'aime.

In 2014, he became widely known for directing the infamous movie United Passions. The film recounts the origins of the world-governing body of association football, Fédération Internationale de Football Association, and was ninety-percent funded by them. Released in North America at the peak of the scandals of the 2015 FIFA corruption case, the film grossed very badly in the box-office (a mere $918 in its opening weekend) and received overwhelming dislike from critics around the world. It's now considered one of the worst movies ever made and all the actors and Auburtin himself considered the film a "disaster".

Filmography

Assistant Director
 Rouge midi (1985) (third assistant director)
 Les Fugitifs (1986) (third assistant director)
 Under the Sun of Satan (1987) (second assistant director)
 La Bohème (1988) (second assistant director)
 La Révolution française (1989) (second assistant director)
 La fille des collines (1990) (first assistant director)
 Merci la vie (1991) (second unit director)
 The Lover (1992) (first assistant director)
 Germinal (1993) (first assistant director)
 The Horseman on the Roof (1995) (first assistant director)
 Lucie Aubrac (1997) (first assistant director)
 The Man in the Iron Mask (1998) (first assistant director)

Director
 Un pont entre deux rives (1999)
 Boulevard du Palais (TV series) (1 episode) (2001)
 Volpone (TV Movie) (2003)
 San-Antonio (2004)
 Paris, je t'aime (2006) (segment "Quartier Latin") 
 La vie à une (TV movie) (2008)
 Envoyés très spéciaux (2009)
 La plus pire semaine de ma vie (TV series) (2 episodes) (2010-2011)
 United Passions (2014)

Actor
 Under the Sun of Satan (1987)
 Un amour de trop (1989)
 The Lover (1992)
 Le secret de Polichinelle (1997)

Writer
 Boulevard du Palais (TV series) (1999)
 Paris, je t'aime (2006)
 United Passions (2014)

Composer
 Un pont entre deux rives (1999)
 Volpone (TV movie) (2003)
 La vie à une (TV movie) (2008)

Production Manager
 Manon des sources (1986) (unit manager)
 Jean de Florette (1986) (unit manager)

Editorial Department
 Paris, je t'aime (2006) (editorial supervisor)

Soundtrack
 Envoyés très spéciaux ("Un euro pour nos otages") (2009)

Himself
 Un jour dans la vie du cinéma français (TV movie documentary) (2002)

References

External links
 Frédéric Auburtin at the Internet Movie Database

Living people
1962 births
French film directors
French male actors
Mass media people from Marseille
French male screenwriters
French screenwriters